Eric Michael Haase (born December 18, 1992) is an American professional baseball catcher for the Detroit Tigers of Major League Baseball (MLB). He made his MLB debut in 2018 for the Cleveland Indians.

Early life 
Haase was born on December 18, 1992, in Detroit, Michigan, to Don and Lori Haase. He grew up in the Detroit suburb of Westland and would practice playing baseball in his childhood home. Haase's father converted a 12-car pole barn into a practice batting cage where his son could hit balls and work on becoming a power hitter. Growing up, Haase and his family supported the Detroit Tigers of Major League Baseball, and Haase's favorite player was catcher Lance Parrish.

In 2008, Haase's freshman year at Divine Child High School in Dearborn, Michigan, he did not originally make the varsity team, but Haase was included on the roster when Divine Child went to the state playoffs. Used mostly as a courtesy runner, Haase saw his first state high school baseball championship that year. He won another state championship with Divine Child as a junior in 2010, this time predominantly playing third base. That year, he batted .454 with eight home runs, 15 doubles, and 47 runs batted in (RBI). During his senior year, Gatorade named Haase their High School Baseball Player of the Year for the state of Michigan. He was also named Michigan's Mr. Baseball in 2011, after batting .495 with 14 home runs and 54 RBI.

Career

Draft and minor leagues (2011–2018) 
The Cleveland Indians selected Haase out of high school in the seventh round, 218th overall, of the 2011 MLB Draft. He had previously committed to play college baseball for the Ohio State Buckeyes, but chose to forgo that commitment in favor of accepting the Indians' $580,000 signing bonus. Primarily drafted as a catcher, the team was also interested in giving Haase time at third base. He began his professional baseball career with the Rookie-level Arizona Fall League (AZL) Indians, batting .300 with two RBI in four games and 10 at bats.

He spent the bulk of the 2012 season in the Arizona League as well, batting .282 with three home runs and 22 RBIs in 28 games and 109 plate appearances. He also appeared in three games with the Class A Short Season Mahoning Valley Scrappers, scoring one hit. From there, Haase spent the entire 2013 season with the Class A Lake County Captains, hitting 14 home runs in 104 games. He spent the 2013-14 offseason working on strength training and his defensive abilities, and when he returned to Lake County for the 2014 season, Haase's coaches praised his ability to block balls and call games from behind the plate.

After starting the 2014 season with Lake County, Haase received a midseason call-up to the Double-A Carolina Mudcats, with whom he hit .185 with four runs, one home run, and six RBIs in 16 games. Haase remained in the Carolina League the following year, as Cleveland changed its Double-A affiliate from the Mudcats to the Lynchburg Hillcats. He started the 2015 season there in a slump before hitting a walk-off home run in the 10th inning of a game against the Wilmington Blue Rocks on June 11. In 90 games with Lynchburg in 2015, Haase batted .247 with nine home runs and 55 RBIs. Defensively, he started 87 games at catcher and threw out 31 percent of attempted base stealers.

He spent the 2016 season with the Akron RubberDucks, hitting 12 home runs and 33 RBI. He split the 2017 season between Akron and the Columbus Clippers, combining to hit 27 home runs and 61 RBI.

After the 2017 season, the Indians added Haase to their 40-man roster.

Cleveland Indians (2018–2019) 
He spent the 2018 minor league season with Columbus, hitting .236/.288/.443/.731 with 20 home runs and 71 RBI. The Indians promoted Haase to the major leagues for the first time on September 1, 2018. He made his major league debut the next day. He hit .125 in 16 major league at bats. 

He opened the 2019 season back with Columbus. Haase appeared in 10 MLB games for the 2019 Indians, hitting just .063. He hit his first major league home run on September 28, 2019. He was designated for assignment on December 29, 2019.

Detroit Tigers (2020–present) 
On January 8, 2020, Haase was traded to the Detroit Tigers in exchange for cash considerations. For the start of the shortened 2020 MLB season, Haase was chosen to be a part of the Detroit Tigers' taxi squad. On September 15, 2020, Haase was recalled by the Tigers. Overall with the 2020 Detroit Tigers, Haase batted .176 with no home runs and 2 RBIs in 7 games. On December 23, 2020, Haase was designated for assignment following the signing of José Ureña. On January 6, 2021, he was outrighted.

On May 12, 2021, Haase was selected to the active roster. He made his 2021 debut on May 13, and went 2-for-4 at the plate. On May 17, 2021, Haase had the first multiple-homer game of his career, hitting a pair of solo home runs against the Seattle Mariners. The next night (May 18), Haase caught Spencer Turnbull's no-hitter against the Mariners, the eighth in Tigers history. On July 27, Haase hit his first career grand slam home run off Hansel Robles of the Minnesota Twins. The slam tied the game at 5–5 in the ninth inning, and the Tigers went on to win in the eleventh inning. With Minnesota's Mitch Garver also hitting a grand slam earlier in this game, it marked the first time in MLB history that opposing catchers hit grand slams in the same game.

On August 2, 2021, Haase was named American League Rookie of the Month for July. He became the first Tiger to win the award since Brennan Boesch in 2010. In July, Haase posted a .265 average and a .627 slugging percentage, with nine home runs and 29 RBI. Overall in 2021, Haase had 22 home runs in 98 games played, while batting .231 and driving in 61 runs. Behind the plate, he threw out 31% of potential base stealers, versus a league average of 23%.

In 2022, Haase made the first opening day roster of his career. He responded on opening day, April 8, by hitting a game-tying ninth-inning home run against the Chicago White Sox. The Tigers won the game later in the inning on a walk-off single by Javier Báez. On September 7 against the Los Angeles Angels, Haase recorded his first career five-hit game, going 5-for-5 at the plate with two singles, two doubles and a home run.

Personal life
Haase and his wife, Maria, have four children.

References

External links

Living people
1992 births
People from Westland, Michigan
Baseball players from Michigan
Major League Baseball catchers
Cleveland Indians players
Detroit Tigers players
Arizona League Indians players
Mahoning Valley Scrappers players
Lake County Captains players
Carolina Mudcats players
Lynchburg Hillcats players
Akron RubberDucks players
Mesa Solar Sox players
Columbus Clippers players